Charles FitzRoy, 2nd Duke of Grafton,  (25 October 1683 – 6 May 1757) was an Irish and English politician.

Early life
He was the only child and heir of Henry FitzRoy, 1st Duke of Grafton (1663–1690) (an illegitimate son of King Charles II by his mistress Barbara Villiers) by his wife Isabella Bennet, 2nd Countess of Arlington, a great-granddaughter of William the Silent. He succeeded to his father's titles on 9 October 1690.

Career
Grafton was one of the members of the Hanoverian-supporting Kit-Cat Club portrayed by Godfrey Kneller. He served as Lord High Steward at King George I's coronation, becoming a Privy Counsellor in 1715 and a Knight of the Garter in 1721. He also served as Lord Lieutenant of Ireland from 1720 to 1724 and Lord Chamberlain from 1724 until his death. In 1719 he was one of the main subscribers to the Royal Academy of Music, a corporation that produced baroque opera on the stage. In 1739 he supported the creation of what was to become one of London's most notable charities, the Foundling Hospital. He sat on that charity's original Court of Governors with such fellow Governors as John Russell, 4th Duke of Bedford, Vere Beauclerk, 1st Baron Vere of Hanworth, and Micajah Perry, a Lord Mayor of London. He was affectionately known to the Royal court as 'Booby Grafton'. For a number of years he and Princess Emily, one of George II's daughters, enjoyed a semi-flirtatious relationship.

Marriage and children
On 30 April 1713, he married Lady Henrietta Somerset (27 August 1690 – 7 August 1726), daughter of Charles Somerset, Marquess of Worcester and Rebecca Child. They had seven children:
Charles Henry FitzRoy, Earl of Euston (13 April 1714 – 18 December 1715)
George FitzRoy, Earl of Euston (24 August 1715 – 7 July 1747). He was married on 10 October 1741 to Lady Dorothy Boyle (14 May 1724 – 2 May 1742) elder daughter of Richard Boyle, 4th Earl of Cork, 3rd Earl of Burlington, and his wife Lady Dorothy Savile, daughter of William Savile, 2nd Marquess of Halifax. The Earl was notorious for mistreating his wife—who died seven months after their marriage—and died childless.
Lord Augustus FitzRoy (16 October 1716 – 24 May 1741). He was married to Elizabeth Cosby, daughter of Colonel William Cosby, who served as a colonial Governor of New York. They were parents to two sons, who founded branches of the family that still continue today:
Augustus FitzRoy, 3rd Duke of Grafton
Charles FitzRoy, 1st Baron Southampton
Lord Charles FitzRoy (23 April 1718 – 29 July 1739)
Lady Caroline FitzRoy (8 April 1722 – 26 June 1784). She married William Stanhope, 2nd Earl of Harrington. They were parents to Isabella Molyneux, Countess of Sefton, Charles Stanhope, 3rd Earl of Harrington and five other children.
Lady Harriet FitzRoy (8 June 1723 – August 1735)
Lady Isabella FitzRoy (1726 – 10 November 1782). She married Francis Seymour-Conway, 1st Marquess of Hertford. They were parents to Francis Seymour-Conway, 2nd Marquess of Hertford and eleven other children.

The Duke also fathered an illegitimate son, Charles FitzRoy-Scudamore.

Legacy
Grafton Street in Dublin is named after him. He owned property in the area. Grafton, Massachusetts, is named after him.

Winchester, New Hampshire was originally named "Arlington" in his honour (as in, the Earl of Arlington).

References

Sources
R.H. Nichols and F.A. Wray, The History of the Foundling Hospital (London: Oxford University Press, 1935)

|-

|-

102
Earls of Arlington
Knights of the Garter
Lord High Stewards
Lord-Lieutenants of Suffolk
Lords Lieutenant of Ireland
Members of the Privy Council of Great Britain
1683 births
1757 deaths
C
Fellows of the Royal Society
Members of the Kit-Kat Club